Scotts Head is a village on the southwest coast of Dominica, in Saint Mark Parish.  In 2001, its population was 721.  Predominantly a fishing village, Scotts Head overlooks Soufrière Bay, which is protected as the Soufrière Scotts Head Marine Reserve.  It is also a popular snorkeling and diving site for tourists.

The village shares its name with the Caribbean's only tied island, a small peninsula with a rising headland that extends westward from the village at Dominica's southwest tip.

Scotts Head holds an annual village feast in honor of Saint Peter in June or July.

History

Scotts Head was named after Colonel George Scott, who had served in the British invasion force that captured Dominica from the French in 1761 and then became lieutenant governor of Dominica from 1764 to 1767.  Scott oversaw the construction of a fort on the headland of the Scotts Head peninsula; the bulk of this fortification has collapsed down the cliff into the water, though some ruins remain, including a small cannon.

When the French retook Dominica in 1778 (only to hand it back in 1783 as a concession in the Treaty of Versailles), the fort at Scotts Head was the first invasion point and the site of the first skirmish.  In anticipation of the invasion, French inhabitants of Dominica visited British troops at the fort on 6 September, getting them drunk and then spiking the cannons with sand.  French fleets sailed between three and four o'clock on 7 September from Martinique, the French-controlled island directly to Dominica's south.  When the French stormed the fort in the morning, the British were taken by surprise.  Once the fort was captured, the French fired a celebration signal, which was the first notice of the invasion the British had in the capital of Roseau to the north.

See also

List of lighthouses in Dominica

References

External links

Populated places in Dominica
Saint Mark Parish, Dominica
Peninsulas of Dominica
Tied islands
Lighthouses in Dominica